Van Beest is a Dutch surname. Notable people with the surname include:

Hidde Van Beest (born 1979), Australian volleyball player
Sybrand van Beest (c. 1610 – 1674), Dutch painter

See also
Jacob Eduard van Heemskerck van Beest (1828–1894), Dutch painter

Dutch-language surnames